Clark Township is the name of some places in the U.S. state of Minnesota:
Clark Township, Aitkin County, Minnesota
Clark Township, Faribault County, Minnesota

See also
Clark Township (disambiguation)
Minnesota township disambiguation pages